Hurtwood House is a private co-educational boarding school and sixth form for pupils aged 15–19 in, Surrey, England.

Synopsis 
The intern students, aged 16–19, organise their studies and leisure in 6 houses: The Hurtwood Main House, The Lodge, Peaslake House, Ewhurst Place, Beatrice Webb House and Cornhill Manor.

In summer of 2007, Hurtwood gave Leith Hill Place (which was also a boarding house for students) back to the National Trust.  They purchased Cornhill Manor towards Ewhurst village proper, which is a mainly rural clustered village, ready for the start of the 2007-2008 academic school year. Each house has its own grounds.

The school, which is non-denominational, offers a two-year pre-university course for students typically aged 16 to 19, mainly focused on GCE 'A' levels.

There are approximately 350 students, divided equally between boys and girls. There is also a high proportion of overseas students who attend the school, notably from the United States and Asia.

The school has a strong national academic record, regularly ranked in a broad category (including 11-16, 11-18 and 13-16, and 13-18 school) as a leading co-educational school.

The school has the highest post-16 contextual value added score of any school in the UK. This takes into account the achievement of students on entry and measures the improvements they make during their courses of study.

Notable alumni 

 Hans Zimmer, composer
 Emily Blunt, actress
 Cleo von Adelsheim, actress
 Nikki Amuka-Bird, actress
 Maxim Baldry, actor
 Kate Aumonier, singer
 Harry Lawtey, actor
 Emily Beecham, actress
 Phoebe Boswell, artist/film maker
 Amelia Brightman, singer
 Amelia Curtis, actress
 Hannah Herzsprung, actress
 Jack Huston, actor
 Tom Lucy, stand up comedian
 Ella Mills, Deliciously Ella
 Tom Mison, actor
 Jay Mo, singer/film maker
 Jake Pratt, actor
 Grigorij Richters, activist and filmmaker
 Joshua Sasse, actor
 Ward Thomas, band
 Michael Willems, photographer 
 Princess Sarah Zeid of Jordan, health advocate
 Tengku Muhammad Fakhry Petra, Malaysian Kelantanese prince

References

External links 
 

Private schools in Surrey
Boarding schools in Surrey
Sixth form colleges in Surrey
Educational institutions established in 1970
1970 establishments in England